Victoria is the capital city of the Canadian province of British Columbia, on the southern tip of Vancouver Island off Canada's Pacific coast. The city has a population of 91,867, and the Greater Victoria area has a population of 397,237.

Named for Queen Victoria, the city is one of the oldest in the Pacific Northwest, with British settlement beginning in 1843. The city has retained a large number of its historic buildings, in particular its two most famous landmarks, the Parliament Buildings (finished in 1897 and home of the Legislative Assembly of British Columbia) and the Empress hotel (opened in 1908). The city's Chinatown is the second oldest in North America, after San Francisco's. The region's Coast Salish First Nations peoples established communities in the area long before European settlement, which had large populations at the time of European exploration.

Known as "the Garden City", Victoria is an attractive city and a popular tourism destination with a regional technology sector that has risen to be its largest revenue-generating private industry. Victoria is in the top twenty of world cities for quality-of-life, according to Numbeo.

History

Early history (1770–1871)
Prior to the arrival of European navigators in the late 1700s, the Victoria area was home to several communities of Coast Salish peoples, including the Songhees. The Spanish and British took up the exploration of the northwest coast, beginning with the visits of Juan Pérez in 1774, and of James Cook in 1778. Although the Victoria area of the Strait of Juan de Fuca was not explored until 1790, Spanish sailors visited Esquimalt Harbour (just west of Victoria proper) in 1790, 1791, and 1792.

In 1841 James Douglas was charged with the duty of setting up a trading post on the southern tip of Vancouver Island. Upon the recommendation by George Simpson a new more northerly post should be built in case Fort Vancouver fell into American hands (see Oregon boundary dispute). Douglas founded Fort Victoria on the site of present-day Victoria in anticipation of the outcome of the Oregon Treaty in 1846, extending the British North America/United States border along the 49th parallel from the Rockies to the Strait of Georgia.

Erected in 1843 as a Hudson's Bay Company trading post on a site originally called Camosack meaning "rush of water". known briefly as "Fort Albert", the settlement was renamed Fort Victoria in November 1843, in honour of Queen Victoria. The Songhees established a village across the harbour from the fort. The Songhees' village was later moved north of Esquimalt in 1911.The crown colony was established in 1849. Between the years 1850–1854 a series of treaty agreements known as the Douglas Treaties were made with indigenous communities to purchase certain plots of land in exchange for goods. These agreements contributed to a town being laid out on the site and made the capital of the colony, though controversy has followed about the ethical negotiation and upholding of rights by the colonial government. The superintendent of the fort, Chief Factor James Douglas was made the second governor of the Vancouver Island Colony (Richard Blanshard was first governor, Arthur Edward Kennedy was third and last governor), and would be the leading figure in the early development of the city until his retirement in 1864.

When news of the discovery of gold on the British Columbia mainland reached San Francisco in 1858, Victoria became the port, supply base, and outfitting centre for miners on their way to the Fraser Canyon gold fields, mushrooming from a population of 300 to over 5000 within a few days. Victoria was incorporated as a city in 1862. In 1862 Victoria was the epicentre of the 1862 Pacific Northwest smallpox epidemic which devastated First Nations, killing about two-thirds of all natives in British Columbia. In 1865, the North Pacific home of the Royal Navy was established in Esquimalt and today is Canada's Pacific coast naval base. In 1866 when the island was politically united with the mainland, Victoria was designated the capital of the new united colony instead of New Westminster – an unpopular move on the Mainland – and became the provincial capital when British Columbia joined the Canadian Confederation in 1871.

Modern history (1871–present)

In the latter half of the 19th century, the Port of Victoria became one of North America's largest importers of opium, serving the opium trade from Hong Kong and distribution into North America. Opium trade was legal and unregulated until 1865, when the legislature issued licences and levied duties on its import and sale. The opium trade was banned in 1908.

In 1886, with the completion of the Canadian Pacific Railway terminus on Burrard Inlet, Victoria's position as the commercial centre of British Columbia was irrevocably lost to the city of Vancouver. The city subsequently began cultivating an image of genteel civility within its natural setting, aided by the impressions of visitors such as Rudyard Kipling, the opening of the popular Butchart Gardens in 1904 and the construction of the Empress Hotel by the Canadian Pacific Railway in 1908. Robert Dunsmuir, a leading industrialist whose interests included coal mines and a railway on Vancouver Island, constructed Craigdarroch Castle in the Rockland area, near the official residence of the province's Lieutenant Governor. His son James Dunsmuir became Premier and subsequently Lieutenant Governor of the province and built his own grand residence at Hatley Park (used for several decades as Royal Roads Military College, now civilian Royal Roads University) in the present City of Colwood.

A real-estate and development boom ended just before World War I, leaving Victoria with a large stock of Edwardian public, commercial and residential buildings that have greatly contributed to the city's character. With the economic crash and an abundance of unmarried men, Victoria became an excellent location for military recruiting. Two militia infantry battalions, the 88th Victoria Fusiliers and the 50th Gordon Highlanders, formed in the immediate pre-war period. Victoria was the home of Sir Arthur Currie. He had been a high-school teacher and real-estate agent prior to the war and was the Commanding Officer of the Gordon Highlanders in the summer of 1914. Before the end of the war he commanded the Canadian Corps. A number of municipalities surrounding Victoria were incorporated during this period, including the Township of Esquimalt, the District of Oak Bay, and several municipalities on the Saanich Peninsula.

Since World War II the Victoria area has seen relatively steady growth, becoming home to two major universities. Since the 1980s the western suburbs have been incorporated as new municipalities, such as Colwood and Langford, which are known collectively as the Western Communities.

Greater Victoria periodically experiences calls for the amalgamation of the thirteen municipal governments within the Capital Regional District. The opponents of amalgamation state that separate governance affords residents a greater deal of local autonomy. The proponents of amalgamation argue it would reduce duplication of services, while allowing for more efficient use of resources and the ability to better handle broad, regional issues and long-term planning.

Geography

Topography

The landscape of Victoria was formed by volcanism followed by water in various forms. Pleistocene glaciation put the area under a thick ice cover, the weight of which depressed the land below present sea level. These glaciers also deposited stony sandy loam till. As they retreated, their melt water left thick deposits of sand and gravel. Marine clay settled on what would later become dry land. Post-glacial rebound exposed the present-day terrain to air, raising beach and mud deposits well above sea level. The resulting soils are highly variable in texture, and abrupt textural changes are common. In general, clays are most likely to be encountered in the northern part of town and in depressions. The southern part has coarse-textured subsoils and loamy topsoils. Sandy loams and loamy sands are common in the eastern part adjoining Oak Bay. Victoria's soils are relatively unleached and less acidic than soils elsewhere on the British Columbia Coast. Their thick dark topsoils denote a high level of fertility which made them valuable for farming prior to urbanization.

Climate

Victoria has a warm-summer Mediterranean climate (Köppen Csb) with fresh, dry, sunny summers and cool winters with moderate precipitation and plentiful cloud cover. Trewartha places it in the Oceanic climate zone (Do).

At the Victoria Gonzales weather station, daily temperatures rise above  on average less than one day per year and fall below  on average only ten nights per year. Victoria has recorded completely freeze-free winter seasons four times (in 1925–26, 1939–40, 1999–2000, and 2002–03). 1999 is the only calendar year on record without a single occurrence of frost. During this time the city went 718 days without freezing, starting on 23 December 1998 and ending 10 December 2000. The second longest frost-free period was a 686-day stretch covering 1925 and 1926, marking the first and last time the city has gone the entire season without dropping below .

The average annual temperature varies from a high of  set in 2004 to a low of  set in 1916.

Due to the rain shadow effect of the nearby Olympic Mountains, Victoria is the driest location on the British Columbia coast and one of the driest in the region.

One feature of Victoria's climate is its distinct dry and rainy seasons. Nearly two-thirds of the annual precipitation falls during the four wettest months, November to February. Precipitation in December, the wettest month is nearly eight times as high as in July, the driest month. Victoria experiences the driest summers in Canada (outside of the extreme northern reaches of the Northwest Territories and Nunavut).

Victoria averages just  of snow annually, about half that of Vancouver. Roughly one third of winters see virtually no snow, with less than  falling during the entire season. When snow does fall, it rarely lasts long on the ground. Victoria averages just two or three days per year with at least  of snow on the ground. Every few decades Victoria receives very large snowfalls including the record breaking  of snow that fell in December 1996. That amount places Victoria 3rd for biggest snowfall among major cities in Canada.

With 2,193 hours of bright sunshine annually during the last available measurement period, Victoria was the second sunniest city in British Columbia after Cranbrook. In July 2013, Victoria received 432.8 hours of bright sunshine, which is the most sunshine ever recorded in any month in British Columbia history.

Victoria's equable climate has also added to its reputation as the "City of Gardens". The city takes pride in the many flowers that bloom during the winter and early spring, including crocuses, daffodils, early-blooming rhododendrons, cherry and plum trees. Every February there is an annual "flower count" in what for the rest of the country and most of the province is still the dead of winter.

Due to its mild climate, Victoria and its surrounding area (southeastern Vancouver Island, Gulf Islands, and parts of the Lower Mainland and Sunshine Coast) are also home to many rare, native plants found nowhere else in Canada, including Quercus garryana (Garry oak), Arctostaphylos columbiana (hairy manzanita), and Canada's only broad-leaf evergreen tree, Arbutus menziesii (Pacific madrone). Many of these species exist here, at the northern end of their range, and are found as far south as southern California and parts of Mexico.

Non-native plants grown in Victoria include the cold-hardy palm Trachycarpus fortunei, which can be found in gardens and public areas of Victoria. One of these Trachycarpus palms stands in front of City Hall.

Demographics

Victoria is one of the most gender diverse cities in Canada, with approximately 0.75% of residents identifying as transgender or non-binary in the 2021 Statistics Canada Census of Population.

Victoria is known for its disproportionately large retiree population. Some 23.4 percent of the population of Victoria and its surrounding area are over 65 years of age, which is higher than the overall Canadian distribution of over 65 year-olds in the population (19%). A historically popular cliché refers to Victoria as the home of "the newly wed and nearly dead".

Ethnic origins

Note: Totals greater than 100% due to multiple origin responses.

 Note: These categories are those used by Statistics Canada.

Religion 
According to the 2021 census, religious groups in Victoria included:
Irreligion (55,750 persons or 63.4%)
Christianity (24,930 persons or 28.4%)
Islam (1,690 persons or 1.9%)
Buddhism (1,220 persons or 1.4%)
Judaism (960 persons or 1.1%)
Hinduism (670 persons or 0.8%)
Sikhism (420 persons or 0.5%)
Indigenous Spirituality (255 persons or 0.3%)

Neighbourhoods 

The following is a list of neighbourhoods in the City of Victoria, as defined by the city planning department. For a list of neighbourhoods in other area municipalities, see Greater Victoria, or the individual entries for those municipalities.

 Burnside/Gorge
 Downtown
 Fairfield
 Fernwood
 Gonzales (Foul Bay)
 Harris Green
 Quadra Village
 James Bay
 Jubilee (North/South)
 North Park
 Oaklands
 Rockland
 Victoria West

Informal neighbourhoods include:

 Chinatown
 Rock Bay
 Oak Bay Border (Foul Bay Road)
 Songhees (part of Victoria West)
 Selkirk

Homelessness
A point-in-time homeless count was conducted by volunteers between March 11 and March 12, 2020, that counted at least 1,523 homeless that night. The homeless count is considered an underestimate due to the hidden homeless that may be couch surfing or have found somewhere to stay that is not on the street or homeless shelters. The first homeless count was conducted in January 2005 by the Victoria Cool Aid Society and counted a homeless population of approximately 700 individuals.

Like many west coast cities in North America the homeless population is both concentrated in specific areas (parts of Pandora avenue in Victoria) and is often outside due to milder climates that make homelessness more visible year-round.

The 2020 point-in-time homeless count found 35% respondents identified as being Indigenous. This is over representative in the homeless population as only 4.7% of the overall population of Victoria identify as Indigenous.

During the COVID-19 pandemic, many homeless people sheltered in camping tents within the city's parks and some roadside greenspaces, including in Beacon Hill Park. In March 2021, city council reinstated a bylaw prohibiting daytime camping in parks, and with support from the provincial government, pledged to find indoor accommodation for all those camping in parks. Homeless campers from parks and other public spaces were housed temporarily in motels, the Save-on-Foods arena and a tiny home village on a portion of the Royal Athletic Park's parking lot.

Economy

The city's chief industries are technology, tourism, education, federal and provincial government administration and services. Other nearby employers include the Canadian Forces (the Township of Esquimalt is the home of the Pacific headquarters of the Royal Canadian Navy), and the University of Victoria (in the municipalities of Oak Bay and Saanich) and Camosun College (which have over 33,000 faculty, staff and students combined). Other sectors of the Greater Victoria area economy include: investment and banking, online book publishing, various public and private schools, food products manufacturing, light aircraft manufacturing, technology products, various high tech firms in pharmaceuticals and computers, engineering, architecture and telecommunications.

Retail
There are three major shopping malls in the City of Victoria, including the Bay Centre, Hillside Shopping Centre, and Mayfair Shopping Centre. Mayfair, one of the first major shopping centres in Victoria, first opened as an outdoor strip mall on 16 October 1963 with 27 stores. It was built on the site of a former brickyard in the Maywood district, a then-semi-rural area in the northern part of Victoria. Woodward's was Mayfair's original department store anchor upon the mall's opening.

Mayfair was enclosed and renovated into an indoor mall in 1974. The mall underwent three later expansions in 1984 (with the addition of Consumers Distributing), 1985 (expansion of the mall food court) and a major expansion in 1990 that saw the addition of more retail space. The Bay (now Hudson's Bay) replaced Woodward's as Mayfair's department store anchor in 1993 following Hudson's Bay Company's acquisition of the Woodward's chain. Mayfair now offers 117 stores and services including Hudson's Bay and Toys "R" Us. It has  of retail space and it also provides customers with rooftop parking.

Technology industry
Advanced technology is Victoria's largest revenue-producing private industry with $3.15 billion in annual revenues generated by more than 880 tech companies that have over 15,000 direct employees. The annual economic impact of the sector is estimated at more than $4.03 billion per year. With three post-secondary institutions, eight federal research labs, and Canada's Pacific Navy Base, Victoria has many of the elements required for a strong technology sector, including Canada's highest household internet usage.

Tourism

Victoria is a major tourism destination with over 3.5 million overnight visitors per year who add more than a billion dollars to the local economy. As well, over 500,000 daytime visitors arrive via cruise ships which dock at Ogden Point near the city's Inner Harbour. Many whale watching tour companies operate from this harbour due to the whales often present near its coast. The city is also close to Canadian Forces Base Esquimalt, the Canadian Navy's primary Pacific Ocean naval base.

Downtown Victoria also serves as Greater Victoria's regional downtown, where many night clubs, theatres, restaurants and pubs are clustered, and where many regional public events occur. Canada Day fireworks displays, Symphony Splash, and many other music festivals and cultural events draw tens of thousands of Greater Victorians and visitors to the downtown core. The Rifflandia and Electronic Music Festival are other music events that draw crowds to the downtown core.

The city and metro region has hosted high-profile sports events including the 1994 Commonwealth Games, the 2009 Scotties Tournament of Hearts, the 2005 Ford World Men's Curling Championship tournament, and 2006 Skate Canada. Victoria co-hosted the 2007 FIFA U-20 World Cup at Royal Athletic Park, and is the venue for the Bastion Square Grand Prix Criterium road cycling race. The city is also a destination for conventions, meetings, and conferences, including a 2007 North Atlantic Treaty Organization military chief of staff meeting held at the Hotel Grand Pacific. Every year, the Swiftsure International Yacht Race attracts boaters from around the world to participate in the boat race in the waters off of Vancouver Island, and the Victoria Dragon Boat Festival brings over 90 teams from around North America. The Tall Ships Festival brings sailing ships to the city harbour. Victoria also hosts the start of the Vic-Maui Yacht Race, the longest offshore sailboat race on the West Coast.

The Port of Victoria consists of three parts, the Outer Harbour, used by deep sea vessels, the Inner and Upper Harbours, used by coastal and industrial traffic. It is protected by a breakwater with a deep and wide opening. The port is a working harbour, tourist attraction and cruise destination. Esquimalt Harbour is also a well-protected harbour with a large graving dock and shipbuilding and repair facilities.

Culture

The Victoria Symphony, led by Christian Kluxen, performs at the Royal Theatre and the Farquhar Auditorium of the University of Victoria from September to May. Every BC Day weekend, the Symphony mounts Symphony Splash, an outdoor event that includes a performance by the orchestra sitting on a barge in Victoria's Inner Harbour. Streets in the local area are closed, as each year approximately 40,000 people attend a variety of concerts and events throughout the day. The event culminates with the Symphony's evening concert, with Tchaikovsky's 1812 Overture as the grand finale, complete with cannon fire from Royal Canadian Sea Cadet Gunners from HMCS QUADRA, a pealing carillon and a fireworks display to honour BC Day. Pacific Opera Victoria, Victoria Operatic Society, Victoria Philharmonic Choir, Canadian Pacific Ballet and Ballet Victoria stage two or three productions each year at the Macpherson or Royal Theatres.

The Bastion Theatre, a professional dramatic company, functioned in Victoria through the 1970s and 1980s and performed high quality dramatic productions but ultimately declared bankruptcy in 1988. Reborn as The New Bastion Theatre in 1990 the company struggled for two more years before closing operations in 1992. The Belfry Theatre started in 1974 as the Springridge Cultural Centre in 1974. The venue was renamed the Belfry Theatre in 1976 as the company began producing its own shows. The Belfry's mandate is to produce contemporary plays with an emphasis on new Canadian plays. Other regional theatre venues include: Phoenix Theatre student theatre at the University of Victoria; The Roxy Theatre, home of the Blue Bridge Repertory Theatre company; Kaleidoscope Theatre and Intrepid Theatre, producers of the Victoria Fringe Theatre Festival and The Uno Festival of Solo Performance.

The only Canadian Forces Primary Reserve brass/reed band on Vancouver Island is in Victoria. The 5th (British Columbia) Field Regiment, Royal Canadian Artillery Band traces its roots back to 1864, making it the oldest, continually operational military band west of Thunder Bay, Ontario. Its mandate is to support the island's military community by performing at military dinners, parades and ceremonies, and other events. The band performs weekly in August at Fort Rodd Hill National Historic Site where the Regiment started manning the guns of the fort in 1896, and also performs every year at the Cameron Bandshell at Beacon Hill Park.

The annual multi-day Rifflandia Music Festival is one of Canada's largest modern rock and pop music festivals.

A number of well-known musicians and bands are from Victoria, including Nelly Furtado, David Foster, The Moffatts, Frog Eyes, Johnny Vallis, Jets Overhead, Bryce Soderberg, Armchair Cynics, Nomeansno, The New Colors, Wolf Parade, The Racoons, Tal Bachman, Dayglo Abortions, Hot Hot Heat and Noah Becker.

Due to the proximity to Vancouver and a 6% distance location tax credit, Victoria is used as a filming location for many films, television series, and television movies. Some of these films include X2, X-Men: The Last Stand, In the Land of Women, White Chicks, Scary Movie, Final Destination, Excess Baggage and Bird on a Wire. Television series such as Smallville, The Dead Zone and Poltergeist: The Legacy were also filmed there. Canadian director Atom Egoyan was raised in Victoria. Actors Cameron Bright (Ultraviolet, X-Men: The Last Stand, Thank You for Smoking, New Moon) and Ryan Robbins (Stargate Atlantis, Battlestar Galactica, Sanctuary) were born in Victoria. Actor Cory Monteith from the television series Glee was raised in Victoria. Actor, artist, and athlete Duncan Regehr of Star Trek: Deep Space Nine was raised in the region. Artist, art magazine publisher and jazz saxophonist Noah Becker of Whitehot Magazine has been a long time Victoria resident.

Nobel laureate Alice Munro lived in Victoria during the years when she published her first story collections and co-founded Munro's Books. Victoria resident Stanley Evans has written a series of mysteries featuring a Coast Salish character, Silas Seaweed, who works as an investigator with the Victoria Police Department. Other Victoria writers include Kit Pearson, Esi Edugyan, Robert Wiersema, W. D. Valgardson, Elizabeth Louisa Moresby, Madeline Sonik, Jack Hodgins, Dave Duncan, Bill Gaston, David Gurr, Ken Steacy, Sheryl McFarlane, Carol Shields and Patrick Lane. Gayleen Froese's 2005 novel Touch is set in Victoria. The comedy troupe LoadingReadyRun is based in Victoria.

Attractions

In the heart of downtown are the British Columbia Parliament Buildings, The Empress Hotel, Victoria Police Department Station Museum, the gothic Christ Church Cathedral, and the Royal British Columbia Museum/IMAX National Geographic Theatre, with large exhibits on local Aboriginal peoples, natural history, and modern history, along with travelling international exhibits. In addition, the heart of downtown also has the Maritime Museum of British Columbia, Emily Carr House, Victoria Bug Zoo, and Market Square. The oldest (and most intact) Chinatown in Canada is within downtown and includes the Chinese Public School built in 1909, and some cultural items and pictures displayed at the Pandora avenue entrances to Market Square. The Art Gallery of Greater Victoria is close to downtown in the Rockland neighbourhood several city blocks from Craigdarroch Castle built by industrialist Robert Dunsmuir and Government House, the official residence of the Lieutenant-Governor of British Columbia.

Numerous other buildings of historic importance or interest are also in central Victoria, including: the 1845 St. Ann's Schoolhouse; the 1852 Helmcken House built for Victoria's first doctor; the 1863 Congregation Emanu-El, the oldest synagogue in continuous use in Canada; the 1865 Angela College built as Victoria's first Anglican Collegiate School for Girls, now housing retired nuns of the Sisters of St. Ann; the 1871 St. Ann's Academy built as a Catholic school; the 1874 Church of Our Lord, built to house a breakaway congregation from the Anglican Christ Church cathedral; the 1890 St. Andrew's Presbyterian Church; the 1890 Metropolitan Methodist Church (now the Victoria Conservatory of Music),
 which is publicly open for faculty, student, and guest performances, also acts as Camosun College Music Department; the 1892 St. Andrew's Cathedral; and the 1925 Crystal Gardens, originally a saltwater swimming pool, restored as a conservatory and most recently a tourist attraction called the B.C. Experience, which closed down in 2006.

Downtown Victoria is a very walkable area with many midblock crosswalks, an expanding central pedestrian street, public squares, and alleys that are predominantly spaces for pedestrians. Fan Tan alley is the narrowest commercial street in North America and runs between Pandora avenue and Fisgard street in Victoria's Chinatown. Dragon alley is also located in Chinatown and is a mix of commercial and residential units, located between Fisgard and Herald streets. Theatre alley was rebuilt in a newer condo construction in Chinatown and is a narrow alley that winds between Pandora avenue and Fisgard street just west of Fan Tan alley, but it does not include direct access to any commercial businesses. Waddington alley is uniquely paved with wooden blocks located between Yates and Johnson streets. Trounce alley is a small commercial alley located between Government and Broad streets.

Beacon Hill Park is the central city's main urban green space. Its area of  adjacent to Victoria's southern shore includes numerous playing fields, manicured gardens, exotic species of plants and animals such as wild peacocks, a petting zoo, and views of the Strait of Juan de Fuca and the Olympic Mountains in Washington across it. The sport of cricket has been played in Beacon Hill Park since the mid-19th century. Each summer, the City of Victoria presents dozens of concerts at the Cameron Band Shell in Beacon Hill Park.

The extensive system of parks in Victoria also includes a few areas of natural Garry oak meadow habitat, an increasingly scarce ecosystem that once dominated the region.

Private gardens that are open to the public with sometimes limited opening hours are located throughout the city and offer access at low or no cost to visitors, they include the rose garden next to the Empress hotel, the gardens on the grounds of the Lieutenant Governor of British Columbia's house (also known as Government House) on Rockland Road, and Abkahazi Garden on Fairfield Road.

Dallas Road is a waterfront trail and road with 7.1 km to walk, run, bike or drive. Clover Point is its main rest area with benches, lounge chairs, picnic tables and a public washroom.

The David Foster Harbour Pathway is a predominantly a pedestrian pathway that meanders around the inner harbour between the southern start at Ogden point by the cruise ship terminal and Rock Bay at its northern terminus. The pathway has some disconnected sections that are expected to be connected with redevelopments along the pathway near the Johnson street bridge. When completed the David Foster Harbour Pathway is expected to extend over 5 kilometres in length.

Outside the city

CFB Esquimalt navy base, in the adjacent municipality of Esquimalt, has a base museum dedicated to naval and military history, in the Naden part of the base.

North of the city on the Saanich Peninsula are the marine biology Shaw Ocean Discovery Centre, Butchart Gardens, one of the biggest tourist and local resident attractions on Vancouver Island, as well as the Dominion Astrophysical Observatory, part of the National Research Council of Canada, Victoria Butterfly Gardens and Centre of the Universe planetarium.

Recreation
Victoria's climate, location and variety of facilities make it ideal for many recreational activities including rock climbing, hiking, kayaking, golf, water sports, informal team sports and jogging.

Victoria is also known as the Cycling Capital of Canada, with hundreds of kilometres of bicycle paths, bike lanes and bike routes in the city, including the Galloping Goose Regional Trail. There are mountain biking trails at Mount Work Regional Park, and Victoria is quickly becoming a bike tourism destination. Cycling advocacy groups including Greater Victoria Cycling Coalition (GVCC) and the Bike to Work Society have worked to improve Victoria's cycling infrastructure and facilities, and to make cycling a viable transportation alternative, attracting 5% of commuters in 2005.

Greater Victoria also has a rich motorsports history, and is home to a 4/10ths mile oval race track called Western Speedway. Opened in 1954, Western Speedway is the oldest speedway in western Canada, and features stock car racing, drag racing, demolition derbies and other events. Western Speedway is also home to the Victoria Auto Racing Hall of Fame and Museum.

The Greater Victoria area also serves as a headquarters for Rugby Canada, based out of Starlight Stadium in Langford, as well as a headquarters for Rowing Canada, based out of Victoria City Rowing Club at Elk Lake in Saanich. The Greater Victoria Sports Hall of Fame is at the Save-on-Foods Memorial Centre, and features numerous displays and information on the sporting history of the city.

The major sporting and entertainment complex, for Victoria and Vancouver Island Region, is the Save-On-Foods Memorial Centre arena. It replaced the former Victoria Memorial Arena, which was constructed by efforts of World War II veterans as a monument to fallen comrades. World War I, World War II, Korean War, and other conflict veterans are also commemorated. Fallen Canadian soldiers in past, present, and future wars and/or United Nations, NATO missions are noted, or will be noted by the main lobby monument at the Save-On-Foods Memorial Centre. The arena was the home of the ECHL (formerly known as the East Coast Hockey League) team, Victoria Salmon Kings, owned by RG Properties Limited, a real estate development firm that built the Victoria Save On Foods Memorial Centre, and Prospera Place Arena in Kelowna. The arena is the home of the Victoria Royals Western Hockey League (WHL) team that replaced the Victoria Salmon Kings (ECHL).

International events 
Victoria has also been a destination for numerous high-profile international sporting events. It hosted the 1994 Commonwealth Games and the 2005 Ford World Men's Curling Championship. The 2007 FIFA U-20 World Cup was co-hosted by Victoria along with five other Canadian cities; (Burnaby, Toronto, Edmonton, Ottawa, Montreal). Victoria was also the first city location of the cross Canada 2010 Winter Olympics torch relay that occurred before the start of the 2010 Winter Olympics. Victoria co-hosted the 2019 World Junior Ice Hockey Championships along with Vancouver, British Columbia. Victoria was one of four host cities for the 2020 FIBA Men's Olympic Qualifying Tournaments in June 2020.

Sports teams

The city has also been home to numerous high-profile sports teams in its history. The Victoria Cougars are perhaps the most famous sports franchise the city has known, existing as members of several professional leagues from 1911 to 1926, and again from 1949 to 1961. The Cougars won the Stanley Cup as members of the WCHL in 1925 after defeating the Montreal Canadiens three games to one in a best-of-five final. The Cougars were reincarnated in 1971 as a major junior hockey team in the Western Hockey League, before they moved to Prince George to become the Prince George Cougars. Today, the Cougars name and legacy continue in the form of the Junior 'B' team that plays in the Vancouver Island Junior Hockey League. Minor professional hockey returned to Victoria in the form of the Victoria Salmon Kings, which played in the ECHL from 2004 to 2011, and were a minor league affiliate of the Vancouver Canucks. In baseball, Victoria was once home of the Victoria Athletics of the Western International League, a Class 'A' minor league baseball affiliate of the New York Yankees. Victoria's newest sports team is Pacific FC of the Canadian Premier League. Pacific FC play their home matches at Starlight Stadium.

Victoria has been home to many accomplished athletes that have participated in professional sports or the Olympics. Notable professional athletes include basketball Hall-of-Famer Steve Nash, twice Most Valuable Player in the National Basketball Association, who grew up in Victoria and played youth basketball at St. Michael's University School and Mount Douglas Secondary School. Furthermore, there are several current NHL hockey players from Greater Victoria, including brothers Jamie Benn and Jordie Benn of the Dallas Stars and Toronto Maple Leafs, respectively; Tyson Barrie of the Edmonton Oilers, and Matt Irwin of the Washington Capitals. Current Philadelphia Phillies pitcher Nick Pivetta was born in Victoria and played summer collegiate baseball for the Victoria HarbourCats. Former professional racing cyclist and 2012 Giro d'Italia winner, Ryder Hesjedal was born in Victoria and still calls the city home. Victoria has also been home to many Olympic Games athletes, including multi-time medalists such as Silken Laumann, Ryan Cochrane, and Simon Whitfield.

Sports teams presently operating in Victoria include:

Notable defunct teams that operated in Victoria include:

 Victoria Capitals (Canadian Baseball League)
 Victoria Cougars (Western Hockey League)
 Victoria Vistas (Canadian Soccer League)
 Victoria Seals (Golden Baseball League)
 Victoria Salmon Kings (ECHL)
 Victoria United FC (Pacific Coast Soccer League)

Infrastructure
The Jordan River Diversion Dam is Vancouver Island's main hydroelectric power station. It was built in 1911.

The city's water is supplied by the Capital Regional District's Water Services Department from its Sooke Lake Reservoir. The lake is connected to a treatment plant at Japan Gulch by the  Kapoor Tunnel. The lake water is very soft and requires no filtering. It is treated with chlorine, ammonia and ultraviolet light to control micro-organisms.

Until the tunnel was completed in 1967, water flowed from the lake through the circuitous, leaky and much smaller  Sooke Flowline.

The Hartland landfill is the waste disposal site for Greater Victoria area. Since 1985, it has been run by the Capital Regional District environmental services. It is on top of a hill, between Victoria and Sidney, at the end of Hartland Avenue There is a recycling centre, a sewer solid waste collection, hazardous waste collection, and an electricity generating station. This generating station now creates 1.6 megawatts of electricity, enough for 1,600 homes. The site has won international environmental awards. The CRD conducts public tours of the facility. It is predicted to be full by 2045.

As of December 15, 2020 the CRD announced that core municipalities within Greater Victoria no longer discharge screened wastewater into the Strait of Juan de Fuca. The wastewater treatment facility was required to comply with federal regulations that forbid untreated discharge into waterways. The wastewater treatment project included pump stations at Clover Point and Macaulay Point in addition to the wastewater treatment plant at McLoughlin Point and the residuals treatment facility at Hartland landfill. The wastewater treatment plant serves Victoria, Esquimalt, Saanich, Oak Bay, View Royal, Langford, Colwood and the Esquimalt and Songhees First Nations.

The Saanich Peninsula wastewater treatment plant serves North Saanich, Central Saanich and the Town of Sidney as well as the Victoria International Airport, the Institute of Ocean Sciences and the Tseycum and Pauquachin First Nations. This is a secondary level treatment plant which produces Class A biosolids.

Transportation

Air

Victoria International Airport has non-stop flights to and from Toronto, Seattle, Montreal (seasonal), select seasonal sun destinations, and many cities throughout Western Canada. Multiple scheduled helicopter and seaplane flights are available daily from Victoria Inner Harbour Airport to Vancouver International Airport, Vancouver Harbour, and Seattle.

Victoria is also home to the world's largest all-seaplane airline, Harbour Air. Harbour air offers flights during daylight hours at least every 30 minutes between Victoria's inner harbour and Vancouver's downtown terminal or YVR south terminal. Harbour Air also operate scenic tour flights over the Victoria harbour and gulf islands area.

Cycling

Due to Victoria's mild year round weather with mostly rainy winters, commuting by bicycle is practical year-round compared to other Canadian cities. For this reason, the Greater Victoria area had the highest rate of bicycle commuting to work of any census metropolitan area in Canada in the 2011 and 2016 census. Greater Victoria also has an expanding system designed to facilitate bicycles and electrically assisted bicycles via bike lanes on many roads as well as separated multi-use paths for bicycles and pedestrians known as the Galloping Goose Regional Trail, Lochside Regional Trail and the E&N rail trail. These multi-use trails are designed exclusively for foot traffic and cyclists and pass through many communities in the Greater Victoria area, beginning at the downtown core and extending into areas such as Langford and Central and North Saanich.

Bike to Work Week Victoria is a bi-annual event held in communities throughout greater Victoria, British Columbia. It is organized by the Greater Victoria Bike to Work Society with a Spring bike to work week scheduled in late May every year and a Fall bike to work week scheduled in October. The purpose of the event is to encourage bicycle commuting. Bike to Work Week began in 1995 in Victoria and has expanded to include other communities in BC through their local bicycle advocacy groups all supported by the Bike to Work BC Society. In 2008, the Bike to Work BC Society was formed as a legal entity to run the event in other communities around BC. Since its inception ridership in the yearly event has steadily increased, and in 2017 over 7000 people participated in Greater Victoria. Bike to Work Week is first a marketing initiative and secondarily a cycling event that aims to attract new daily riders to commuting by bicycle. The behaviour change (public health) model, relying on research conducted by both the provincial and federal governments that identified barriers to cycling and reasons for choosing cycling, was applied as a way to accomplish the goal of recruiting employees to bicycle to work.

Victoria is building a protected bike lane network intended for all ages and abilities (AAA). The first lane opened in Spring 2017 on Pandora Avenue, between Store street and Cook street in the downtown core. The protected lane makes for an easy cycling connection across the new (April 2018) Johnson Street bridge, to the Galloping Goose Trail and E&N rail trail. The second protected bike lane in the network opened on Fort Street May 27, 2018. The next two roads added to the downtown area bike network were Wharf and Humboldt streets, completed in 2019 and 2020 respectively. Vancouver street and Graham/Jackson streets were also added to the AAA bike network in 2021. The next round of streets to be upgraded starting in 2021 as complete streets with AAA cycling infrastructure include Richardson, Haultain, Government (north of Pandora avenue and up to Gorge road), Kimta road (connecting the network to the E&N rail trail). New connector routes in Fernwood, Oaklands and between Haultain street and the Vancouver street network that will avoid hills and add safer biking/walking crossings will also to be constructed starting in 2021. In 2022 the city plans to construct further AAA bicycle connections along Montreal street, Superior street, Government street (south, between Humboldt street and Dallas road), Fort street (between Cook street and up to the municipal border with Oak Bay), and Gorge Road (between Government street and up to the municipal border with Saanich).

Ferries
Victoria is served by several ferries with the Lower Mainland, Gulf Islands and the United States. BC Ferries provides service between Swartz Bay, up the Saanich peninsula from Victoria, to Tsawwassen on the Lower Mainland for cars, bus, trucks, pedestrians and cyclists. The Coho ferry operates as a car and pedestrian/cyclist ferry between the inner harbour of Victoria and Port Angeles, Washington. The Victoria Clipper is a passenger-only (no vehicles) ferry which operates daily, year-round between downtown Seattle and the inner harbour of Victoria. The Washington State Ferries runs a ferry for cars, pedestrians and cyclists between Friday Harbor, Orcas Island and Anacortes in Washington State from the port at Sidney, up the Saanich peninsula from Victoria.

Public transit

Local public transportation is run by the Victoria Regional Transit System, which is part of BC Transit. Since 2000, double-decker buses have been introduced to the fleet, and have become an icon for the city. Rider fare payments can be made in cash, monthly bus passes, disability yearly passes, day-passes purchased from the driver or tickets purchased from a store. As of April 1, 2016 bus drivers do not provide transfers as proof of payment. Transfers were a source of disagreement and delay on the bus, due to improper transfer use, and disagreements over expired transfers or transfers used for return trips. Instead, a day-pass was added that can be purchased from the bus driver for $5, or two bus tickets (purchased from a retailer) for the equivalent of $4.50. To improve bus reliability and reduce delays, a bike and bus priority lane was opened in 2014 during peak traffic periods with fines for motorists operating in the bus/bike lane who are not turning in the same block. The dedicated bike and bus lane on Douglas street is being expanded from Downtown to near Uptown and may be changed to be restricted to only buses and bikes 24/7 rather than just during peak traffic periods depending on direction of travel. Most buses operating in the Greater Victoria area have a bike rack installed at the front of the bus that can accommodate two bicycles.

Rail
Passenger rail service previously operated by Via Rail provided a single daily return trip along between Victoria – Courtenay, along the eastern coast of Vancouver Island, to the cities of Nanaimo, Courtenay, and points between. The service was discontinued along this line indefinitely on 19 March 2011, due to needed track replacement work. Prior to further inspection of the track, service along the segment between Nanaimo and Victoria was originally planned to resume on 8 April, but lack of funding has prevented any of the work from taking place and it is unclear when or if the service will resume.

Roads
Local roadways are not based on a grid system as they are in Vancouver or Edmonton, and many streets do not follow a straight line from beginning to end as they wind around hills, parks, coastlines, and historic neighbourhoods, often changing names two or three times. There is no directional indication in street names that may be used in other cities with numbered roads where a street may run north–south or avenue may run east–west.

The compact size of the city with few steep hills lends itself readily to smaller, fuel efficient alternatives to full size passenger cars, such as scooters, Smart Cars, motorcycles and electric bicycles. Victoria incentivizes the use of smaller modes of transport by offering smaller metered parking spaces in the downtown core specifically designated for small vehicles and motorcycles. Rush hour traffic delays along the Trans-Canada Highway to western suburban municipalities (including Langford, Colwood, Sooke and Metchosin) is commonly referred to as the "Colwood Crawl".

Victoria serves as the western terminus (Mile Zero) for Canada's Trans-Canada Highway, the longest national highway in the world. The Mile Zero marker is at the southernmost point of Douglas Street where it meets Dallas Road along the waterfront. The Mile Zero location includes a statue to honour Terry Fox.

Other transportation 
Coach bus service between downtown Victoria and downtown Vancouver or the Vancouver International Airport, which includes the ferry fare is called the BC Ferries Connector run by Wilson's Transportation Limited. The coach bus travels on the ferry to Vancouver with separate trips for the bus to downtown and a bus to the Vancouver International Airport (YVR). Average travel time between the two cities is under 4 hours with an hour and half of that time spent on the ferry crossing.

Bus service from Victoria to points up island is run by Island Link Bus or Tofino Bus. Both bus services depart from the Victoria bus terminal at 700 Douglas Street, behind the Fairmont Empress Hotel and offer trips to destinations further up island and the west coast of the island.

Education

The city of Victoria lies entirely within the Greater Victoria School District. Victoria High School is the only public high school located within the municipal boundaries of the city of Victoria. Opened August 7, 1876, Victoria High School is the oldest High School in North America north of San Francisco and west of Winnipeg, Manitoba. Many of the elementary schools in Victoria offer both French immersion and English programs of instruction. École Victor-Brodeur in Esquimalt serves as a dedicated school for Francophones.

Greater Victoria is served by three public post secondary educational institutions, listed by student population size below:

 University of Victoria (UVic), with 22,020 undergraduate and graduate students. The University of Victoria is located within the boundaries of the District of Saanich and the District of Oak Bay.
 Camosun College, with 20,400 learners. Camosun College has two campuses (Lansdowne and Interurban), both of which are located within the District of Saanich. 
 Royal Roads University (RRU) with 4,748 full-time undergraduate and graduate students.  The Royal Roads University campus is located in Colwood.

In addition, there are several private schools serving the Greater Victoria community, including the Chinese School in Chinatown, the Christ Church Cathedral School, Glenlyon-Norfolk School, Lester B. Pearson United World College of the Pacific, Victoria College of Art, a Justice Institute of British Columbia campus, Pacific Rim College, and the Sprott Shaw College that has had a campus in Victoria since 1913

Media

Victoria is the only Canadian provincial capital without a local CBC Television station, owned-and-operated or affiliate, although it does host a small CBC Radio One (CBCV-FM) station at 780 Kings Road. The region is considered to be a part of the Vancouver television market, receiving most stations that broadcast from across the Strait of Georgia, including CBC Television, Ici Radio-Canada Télé, CTV, Global, Citytv and Omni owned-and-operated stations. The two television stations based in Victoria are CHEK-DT (an independent station) and CIVI-DT (a CTV 2 owned-and-operated station).

Notable people

Tyson Barrie, hockey player, NHL Edmonton Oilers
Jamie Benn, hockey player, NHL Dallas Stars
Jordie Benn, hockey player, NHL Toronto Maple Leafs
David Holmes Black, media proprietor, founder of Black Press
Emily Carr, artist
David Foster, music composer
Nelly Furtado, singer and songwriter
Rhonda Ganz, poet and illustrator
Ryder Hesjedal, road cyclist and winner of the 2012 Giro d'Italia
Cory Monteith, actor and musician
Alice Munro, short story writer
Steve Nash, basketball player and 2x NBA MVP
Bill Reid, artist and carver
Spiritbox, heavy metal band
Tudi Wiggins, actress
Calum Worthy, actor

Sister cities

Victoria has three sister cities:
 Napier, New Zealand
 Morioka, Japan
 Suzhou, China

As of March 4, 2022, Victoria City Council voted to suspend the city's relationship with Khabarovsk, Russia as a result of the 2022 Russian invasion of Ukraine.

See also

 Dallasite, unofficial gemstone of Victoria, British Columbia
 Leaky condo crisis
 List of historic places in Victoria, British Columbia
 Monarchy in British Columbia
 Old Victoria Custom House
 Victoria (disambiguation)#Places

Notes

References

External links

 
1849 establishments in North America
Cities in British Columbia
Former colonial capitals in Canada
Greater Victoria
Populated coastal places in Canada
Populated places established in 1849
Populated places on the British Columbia Coast
Port cities and towns on the Canadian Pacific coast